The following lists events that happened during 2003 in the Democratic Republic of São Tomé and Príncipe.

Incumbents
President: Fradique de Menezes
Prime Minister: Maria das Neves

Events
January 22: President Fradique de Menezes dissolved parliament over disagreements related to issues of presidential power.
July 16-23: An attempted coup d'état took place.

Sports
Inter Bom Bom won the São Tomé and Príncipe Football Championship.

References

 
Years of the 21st century in São Tomé and Príncipe
2000s in São Tomé and Príncipe
São Tomé and Príncipe
São Tomé and Príncipe